The Bangladesh Golf Federation is the national federation for golf and is responsible for governing the sport in Bangladesh. SM Shafiuddin Ahmed, Chief of Army Staff of the Bangladesh Army, is the president of Bangladesh Golf Federation. Major General Md Zahirul Islam, ndc, psc is the vice-president and Brigadier General Md Tajul Islam Thakur is the general secretary of the federation respectively.

History
The Bangladesh Golf Federation was established in 2001. The Bangladesh Golf Federation is associated with the Bangladesh Olympic Association. It is under the National Sports Council of the Ministry of Youth and Sports. The federation has 14 golf clubs associated with it. The clubs associated with it are Army Golf Club, Bangladesh Ordnance Factory Golf Club, Bhatiary Golf and Country Club, Bogra Golf Club, Cox’s Bazar Golf and Country Club, Chengi Golf and Country Club, Ghatail Golf Club, Jashore Golf and Country Club, Kurmitola Golf Club, Mainamati Golf and Country Club, Rangpur Golf Club, Shaheen Golf and Country Club and Savar Golf Club.

References

Golf in Bangladesh
Golf associations
National members of the Asia Pacific Golf Confederation
1998 establishments in Bangladesh
Sports organizations established in 1998
Golf
Organisations based in Dhaka